Two Butte Creek is a  tributary of the Arkansas River that flows from a source near Kim, Colorado, USA.  It joins the Arkansas just south of the town of Holly.

See also
List of rivers of Colorado

References

Rivers of Colorado
Tributaries of the Arkansas River
Rivers of Las Animas County, Colorado
Rivers of Baca County, Colorado
Rivers of Prowers County, Colorado